Jules Hardy  (July 16, 1932 – October 28, 2022) was a Canadian neurosurgeon.

Early life and education
Born in Sorel, Quebec on July 16, 1932, Hardy graduated as a doctor of medicine from the Université de Montréal in 1956, followed then by postgraduate work at the Université de Montréal as well as at McGill University. In 1962, he received a specialist certification in neurosurgery from the Quebec College of Physicians.

Career
Hardy was a professor of neurosurgery at the Notre-Dame Hospital and the University of Montreal teaching centre. He was also the director of the Université de Montréal's neurosurgery program from 1979 to 1985. 

He authored over 140 papers and has contributed to several textbooks. He has also received a number of awards for his work in the field of pituitary surgery and has contributed in the fields of neurophysiology and neurosurgery.

Death
Hardy died on October 28, 2022, at the age of 90.

Honours
 1974 - Received the order of merit for sciences and health from the government of Lebanon
 1978 - Queen Elizabeth II Silver Jubilee Medal
 1979 - Honorary doctorate from the University of Guadalajara in Mexico
 1987 - Officer of the Order of Canada
 1989 - Knight of the National Order of Quebec
 1989 - Recipient of the Prix Léo-Pariseau
 1989 - Recipient of the Prix Izaak-Walton-Killam

References

1932 births
2022 deaths
Scientists from Quebec
Knights of the National Order of Quebec
Officers of the Order of Canada
Academic staff of the Université de Montréal
Canadian neurosurgeons
Canadian neuroscientists
20th-century Canadian scientists
21st-century Canadian scientists